The Turkish Formula Three Championship is an international motor racing series that takes place primarily in Turkey. It is a junior-level feeder formula that uses small single seater Formula Three chassis. The races are held in İzmit Körfez Circuit, Kocaeli Province and Pınarbaşı Racing Circuit, İzmir.

History
The first Formula Three championship in Turkey was held in 1994 following importation of F3 cars end of 1993 sponsored by cooking oil refinery Olin and cigarette brand Marlboro. At the first edition drivers Mahir Bayındır, İbrahim Levent, Cem Hakko, Hakan Dinç, Ali Başakıncı, Ertan Nacaroğlu, Mert Dura and Mümtaz Tahincioğlu, the future president of the Turkish Motorsport Federation, took part.

In following years, the number of cars increased. Drivers such as İlham Dökümcü, Jason Tahincioğlu, Uğur Işık, Yalın Kılıç, Emre Ergör and Mehmet Kasap joined the championship. While in the end of the 1990s more than ten cars were racing, the number of participants dropped to four due to economic crisis in the country. However, the championship regained its former extent in 2002 and 2003 when more drivers and sponsors joined. In 2003, Turkey's first ever female F3-pilot Selin Yardımcı took part in the series.

Specifications
The initial cars imported by Olin and Marlboro based on Fiat engines, which exist still in most of the cars. The F3 cars imported in 2001 for G-Force Team have Renault engines.

The lack of a straight sufficient length at circuits in Turkey does not allow higher speeds.

Teams
In the mid 2000s, four teams competed in the Turkish championship. These were G-Force, Team Active, Ar Racing and Beste Motorsports.

References

 
1994 establishments in Turkey
Recurring sporting events established in 1994
Formula Three series